MLB in Omaha was a Major League Baseball (MLB) game played between the Detroit Tigers and Kansas City Royals of MLB's American League on June 13, 2019. The game was played at TD Ameritrade Park in Omaha, Nebraska, two days before the start of that season's College World Series, held at the same venue. This was the first regular-season MLB contest played in the state of Nebraska. The game, sponsored by GEICO and broadcast on ESPN, was won by the Royals, 7–3.

Background
In June 2018, the MLB announced that the Tigers and Royals would play a regular season game at TD Ameritrade Park in Omaha, Nebraska. MLB wanted a way to connect College Baseball with Major League Baseball, and did so by scheduling an MLB game two days before the 2019 College World Series in Omaha.

Game

Recap
The Royals served as the home team, while the Tigers were the visitors. Matthew Boyd was the starting pitcher for Detroit, and Homer Bailey started for Kansas City. Nicky Lopez hit his first career home run where he played college baseball to start the scoring for the Royals. Homer Bailey pitched six scoreless innings and got the win while Matthew Boyd was given the loss. The Royals won the game 7–3.

Line score

Box score

Pitching

Pitching

See also
List of neutral site regular season Major League Baseball games played in the United States and Canada

References

2019 in sports in Nebraska
2019 Major League Baseball season
Major League Baseball games
Detroit Tigers
Kansas City Royals